There have been over 1,200 rugby league footballers who have played for the Sydney Roosters in the premiership since its foundation in 1908. They are listed in order of cap number, with the first going to the club's inaugural captain, Harry “Jersey” Flegg. The Sydney Roosters are one of only two extant clubs from the League's foundation year of 1908, and are the only one to have played continuously in all seasons since, making their players' register one of the most extensive. Only first grade stats are counted and non first grade stats do not apply on this list.

List of players
 NRL List updated as of Round 3 2023 v Souffs Scummitohs.
 NRLW List updated as of conclusion of 2022 season.
 Mens players highlighted in bold are contracted with the Roosters for the current 2023 NRL season.

Women's

External links
Men's Honour Roll
Home - Rugby League Project

 
National Rugby League lists
Lists of Australian rugby league players
Sydney-sport-related lists